Tujak-e Jadid (also Romanized as Tūjak-e Jadīd) is a village in Zarabad-e Sharqi Rural District, Zarabad District, Konarak County, Sistan and Baluchestan Province, Iran. At the 2006 census, its population was 65, in 15 families.

References 

Populated places in Konarak County